Henry Augustus Wise (May 24, 1819 – April 3, 1869) was an author and United States Navy officer.

Biography
He was born in Brooklyn, New York, to George Stewart Wise and Catherine Standsberry. The Wise family moved to Virginia and his Naval career began in 1834 as a midshipman. Henry served in the U.S.–Mexican War as a lieutenant on board the razee , seeing action in the Gulf of California. He dedicated his consequent naval service in becoming an expert in gunnery. When the American Civil War broke out he considered serving with his home state of Virginia when they left the Union but opted to stay in the U.S. Navy as a captain. In 1864 President Abraham Lincoln appointed Wise chief of the Bureau of Ordnance, and he was promoted to captain in 1866; he held the ordnance position until his resignation in 1868. He died in Naples, Italy, the following year.
In 1850 he married Catherine Brooks Everett, daughter of Edward Everett and Charlotte Gray Brooks.

Children
 Charlotte Everett Wise  (1851–1935) married Archibald Hopkins
 Katherine Wise  (1852–1920) married Jacob W. Miller
 Edward Everett Wise   (1854–1891)  married Marion McAllister
 Henrietta Augusta Wise  (1860–1920) married (1) Lt. John Downes (2) W.K. Nicholsen

Principal works
Under the pen name of "Harry Gringo"
 Los Gringos, or an Interior View of Mexico and California, with Wanderings in Peru, Chile, and Polynesia, 1854. (Used as the basis for the 1906 opera The Sacrifice, Op. 27, by Frederick Converse)
 Tales for the Marines, 1855
 Scampavias: From Gibel-Tarek to Stamboul, 1857 
 The Story of the Gray African Parrot, 1859 
 Captain Brand of the Schooner Centipede, 1860–64

References
Notes

Sources
Duyckinck, Evert A., and George L. Duyckinck. "Henry Augustus Wise. Cyclopaedia of American Literature; Embracing Personal and Critical Notices of Authors, and Selections from Their Writings. From the Earliest Period to the Present Day; with Portraits, Autographs, and Other Illustrations.  New York: C. Scribner, 1856. (pp. 669–70) Accessed January 28, 2008
Wise, Jennings C. Col. John Wise of England and Virginia (1617-1695); His Ancestors and Descendants. Richmond Va: Bell Books and Stationery Co, 1918. Accessed January 28, 2008

External links

 
 

United States Navy officers
1819 births
1869 deaths
People from Brooklyn
19th-century American writers
American military personnel of the Mexican–American War
Union Navy officers
People of Virginia in the American Civil War
19th-century American male writers